This is a list of serial dramas released by TVB in 2011.

Top ten drama series in ratings
The following is a list of the highest-rated drama series released by TVB in 2011. The list includes premiere week, final week ratings, as well as the average overall count of live Hong Kong viewers (in millions).

Awards

First line-up
These dramas air in Hong Kong from 8:00pm to 8:30pm, Monday to Friday on Jade.

Second line-up
These dramas air in Hong Kong from 8:30pm to 9:30pm, Monday to Friday on Jade.

Third line-up
These dramas air in Hong Kong from 9:30pm to 10:30pm, Monday to Friday on Jade.

Fourth line-up
These dramas air in Hong Kong from 10:30pm to 11:00pm, Monday to Friday on Jade.

References

External links
  TVB.com

2011
2011 in Hong Kong television